Brandon is an unincorporated community and census-designated place (CDP) in Hillsborough County, Florida, United States. It is part of the Tampa–St. Petersburg–Clearwater Metropolitan Statistical Area. The population was 114,626 at the 2020 census, up from 103,483 at the 2010 census.

History

Founding
Its history began on January 20, 1857, when John Brandon arrived at Fort Brooke (now Tampa) from Mississippi with his first wife Martha and six sons. At first he moved his family to what is now the Seffner area. Then in August 1858, John Brandon purchased  in the New Hope area (now Brandon) and  later on and then named his land "Brandon". John and his second wife Victoria's house was located on what would become the corner of Knights Avenue and Victoria Street. Four years later, the New Hope Church was built on land donated by Brandon. Besides being the first church in the community, it also served as Brandon's first school.

In 1890, the Florida Central and Peninsular Railroad came through the area, encouraging the people of New Hope to build a depot on Moon Avenue. Charles S. Noble, an engineer for the FC&P, was asked to plat approximately forty acres of land north of present-day State Road 60, south of Lake Meade, east of Kings Avenue, and west to Parsons Avenue. Filed on April 24, 1890, the surveyor named the community in honor of John Brandon and Noble Street for himself.

Stowers Funeral Home is a famous landmark in Brandon, in a building erected by John Brandon's son James.

Early 20th century
Since then, Brandon has grown in spurts, beginning with the first general store opened by Dan Galvin on the corner of Moon Avenue and Victoria Street. In 1905 a school was built on Parsons Avenue, and Victoria Brandon allowed new teachers to board with her.

At the time, Valrico began to develop to the east as Victoria's son Lovic moved there and opened a general store. Lovic and Victoria's other son, Mark, organized the Valrico Baptist Church in 1915, which later moved to Brandon and became the First Baptist Church in 1930.

By 1914, the community needed a large central school to house all of the area's students, so the Brandon Grade School (now McLane Middle School) was built on Knights Avenue to house grades 1 through 12. In 1919 Brandon Grade School enrolled the largest class to date totaling 119 students. The school's first Principal, John T. Bushong was responsible for expanding the school to grade 12 and in 1923 it graduated four seniors.

The first Brandon census was taken in 1922 when the population was 100. In 1925, Hopewell Road became a  paved road, and residents such as Clarence Hampton began building businesses along it in 1927. Hampton opened the first gas and service station.

During the 1920s, the eastern border of Brandon was Pinewood Avenue. Beyond that was the Kingsway Poultry Colony, where chickens were raised during the winter to be sold in Ybor City. During the Great Depression the poultry farms closed, until around 1946, when Bill and Ann Hollash moved to Brandon and started Brandon Egg (which later became Hollash Eggs), the largest egg producers in eastern Hillsborough County. Hollash Eggs closed in the late 1990s.

Most local residents worked in the two orange packing houses in Valrico. The center of town remained at Moon Avenue and Victoria Street, where the train depot, post office, school, and grocery store were all located. For entertainment and everything else, the train to Tampa was the way to go, as only a few paved roads existed, with most being dirt- or shell-topped, making the drive to Tampa very difficult.

World War II was an interesting time in Brandon, with little growth, but a definite edge as they had the food they raised on their farms. After the war, new businesses began to open. A drug store and soda fountain at the corner of Parsons Avenue and Hopewell Road quickly became a popular teenage hangout. In 1950, Scogin's opened their famous variety store on Hopewell Road, and in 1953 Brandon got its first physician, Dr. V. R. Hunter.

The 1950s were the beginning of the real growth period for Brandon. Yates Elementary was built in 1954, followed by Mann Junior High School in 1957. Brandon Grade School, on Knights Avenue, became the first Brandon High School. At the time, there were fewer than 100 graduates a year. In 1956, Hopewell Road was connected to Adamo Drive, which made access to Tampa easier, thus turning Brandon into a bedroom community. With commuters came subdivisions, the first of which was Hill-Dale Heights on Kingsway Avenue. The Brandon News was established in 1958 as a one-page newsletter and advertisement for Scogin's clothing store, written by Al & Chris Scogin. Brandon's first honorary mayor's race was held in 1959 and was won by Nat Storms.

Era of rapid growth

In 1959, the Brandon Chamber of Commerce was formed to help promote business and growth. By the early 1960s, Brandon's population was 8,000, and it was estimated that one new family moved into town every day. Brandon began spreading out into the bordering communities of Limona, Seffner, and Valrico; Hopewell Road became four lanes wide and was designated State Road 60. Soon, the town's first shopping center, Brandon Center, was built, and Brooker Elementary School and the Brandon Swim and Tennis Club opened in 1961 and 1963 respectively. In the next few years, Kingswood Elementary School, the Brandon Public Library, and many housing developments, shopping centers, and golf courses further fueled or reflected the influx of new residences and businesses.

By the 1970s, growth was causing traffic congestion, as approximately 430 commercial and service businesses, three malls and a population of 40,000 were all contained within a  radius.

In the mid-1970s, Hillsborough Community College moved to Brandon by holding classes at public schools. More indications of the increasing population were the building of Brandon Community Hospital and the Brandon Cultural Center (now the Center Place Fine Arts and Civic Association).

Brandon took off rapidly during the 1980s. Development of the southern area of Brandon brought thousands of new residents. On September 27, 1986, Interstate 75 began to bring traffic through the Brandon area, dramatically changing the community and helping its population reach nearly 58,000 by 1990.

Geography
Brandon's census boundaries include Palm River-Clair Mel to the west across U.S. Route 301, Valrico to the east, Riverview and Bloomingdale to the south, and East Lake-Orient Park, Mango, and Seffner to the north. Interstate 75 passes through the western part of the Brandon CDP, with access from Exits 256 (US 301) and 257 (Florida State Road 60/Brandon Boulevard).

Neighborhoods within Brandon include Barrington Oaks East, Brandon Hills, Kensington Estates, La Viva, and Limona.

Climate

Brandon, like the Tampa Bay area, has a humid subtropical climate. Unlike Tampa and Pinellas County, Brandon will typically have a few nights below freezing each year due to its greater distance from the coast. The summers are long and hot, and average ; winters are mild and dry, averaging . Brandon's winters may have low temperatures in the 30s for more than four days, while Tampa can have low temperatures in the 40s and 50s in that same period of time.

Demographics

As of 2010, there were 43,352 households, out of which 8.1% were vacant. As of 2000, 38.1% households had children under the age of 18 living with them, 58.7% were married couples living together, 11.7% had a female householder with no husband present, and 25.8% were non-families. 19.6% of all households were made up of individuals, and 4.5% had someone living alone who was 65 years of age or older.  The average household size was 2.68 and the average family size was 3.10.

In 2000, in the CDP the population was spread out, with 26.9% under the age of 18, 8.5% from 18 to 24, 33.5% from 25 to 44, 22.4% from 45 to 64, and 8.7% who were 65 years of age or older.  The median age was 34 years. For every 100 females, there were 94.0 males.  For every 100 females age 18 and over, there were 90.9 males.

In 2000, the median income for a household in the CDP was $51,639, and the median income for a family was $56,931. Males had a median income of $37,454 versus $28,935 for females. The per capita income for the CDP was $22,080.  About 6.9% of families and 7.6% of the population were below the poverty line, including 5.7% of those under age 18 and 5.3% of those age 65 or over.

Languages
As of 2000, English spoken as a first language accounted for 85.24% of all residents, while 14.75% spoke other languages as their mother tongue. The most significant were Spanish speakers who made up 11.07% of the population, while German came up as the third most spoken language, which made up 0.57%, and Tagalog was at fourth, with 0.44% of the population.

Economy

Known for being a bedroom community for Tampa, Brandon boasts many characteristic establishments that have lasted over a quarter of a century. Brandon is the birthplace of Beef O'Brady's, a family-oriented bar and grill chain restaurant with locations throughout the southeastern United States.

Arts and culture
Brandon is home to Westfield Brandon (originally Brandon Town Center), the AMC Regency 20 movie theatre and the Florida Academy for the Performing Arts based at Music Showcase. Although street addresses indicate their locations in Tampa, the multilevel entertainment facility TopGolf, and the arcade restaurant attraction Dave and Buster's are closely associated to Brandon due to their proximity to Westfield Brandon.

County fair

The Hillsborough County Fairgrounds sits on the west side of Brandon on SR 60. In 2011-2012, the Hillsborough County Fair made its permanent home here on a plot of land on a rural part of State Road 60. Throughout the years, the fair was held at various locations. The Fair takes place from October 16–20.

Brandon Regional Library
The Brandon Regional Library is a two-story library in Brandon that caters to the communities of Brandon, Valrico, and Lithia. It is a branch of the Tampa–Hillsborough County Public Library System. It opened at its current location on March 10, 1991, and the building is approximately 25,000 square feet. The library shares a building with Center Place Fine Arts and Civic Association, however, both organizations remain autonomous in operation.

Planning and land acquisition for a new Brandon library is underway. The existing site is constrained and offers limited options for building expansions to both the library and to on-site parking, which is currently inadequate for the number of customers who visit the facility. As a result, the Board of County Commissioners approved funding for the acquisition of a new site to relocate and expand the facility. The project will be funded with ad valorem tax proceeds from the Special Library Taxing District and a Public Library Construction Grant through the Florida Department of State.

Education
Brandon's public schools are operated by the Hillsborough County Public School system.

There is one public high school in Brandon: 
Brandon High School, established in 1914 and was the second high school created in Hillsborough County.

Public middle schools include:
Burns
McLane
Mann

Public elementary schools include:
Brooker
Buckhorn
Kingswood
Limona
Schmidt
Yates
Mintz

Private schools:
Bell Shoals Baptist Academy
Brandon Academy Private School
Central Baptist School
Faith Baptist
Nativity Catholic School
Immanuel Lutheran School
Providence Christian School

Colleges:
Emmaus Baptist College is located in Brandon
Hillsborough Community College Brandon campus had an enrollment of over 12,000 in the 2015 school year.
Southern Technical College operates a campus in Brandon.

Infrastructure
Brandon is served primarily by four local and three express Hillsborough Area Regional Transit bus lines.

Notable people
Brooke Bennett, Olympic swimmer
Tony Cristiani, football player
"Nasty" Ronnie Galetti, professional wrestler and founding vocalist of the thrash metal band Nasty Savage, formed in Brandon in 1983
Chris Gannon, football player, was born in Brandon
Franklin Gómez, freestyle wrestler
 Joey Graham, professional basketball player
 Stevie Graham, professional basketball player
Sterling Hitchcock, professional baseball player
Toney Mack, professional basketball player
 Admiral Charles D. Michel, 30th Vice Commandant of the United States Coast Guard
Paul Orndorff, professional wrestler
Dwayne Schintzius, professional basketball player
Shannon Spruill, professional wrestler, valet, commentator, and ring announcer, known as Daffney
Brent Underwood, entrepreneur

References

External links

Brandon Chamber of Commerce
Brandon City Guide

1857 establishments in Florida
Census-designated places in Hillsborough County, Florida
Populated places established in 1857
Census-designated places in Florida
Unincorporated communities in Florida